Knut Aastad Bråten (born 1976) is a Norwegian magazine editor.

He is a grandson of ski jumper Johanne Kolstad.

An ethnologist by education, he edited the Norwegian folk music magazine Spelemannsbladet from 2007. He is an able langeleik player himself. In 2010 the magazine was discontinued, but resurfaced as Folkemusikk. In 2014 he took over as editor of Syn og Segn.

References

1976 births
Living people
People from Nord-Aurdal
Norwegian folk musicians
Norwegian ethnologists
Norwegian magazine editors
Nynorsk-language writers
Norwegian LGBT writers